"Tous les secrets" (meaning "All the Secrets" or "Every Secret") is the second single from Celine Dion's 2005 French-language greatest hits album, On ne change pas and also a theme song from the animated movie Asterix and the Vikings. It was released in March 2006.

Background and release
"Tous les secrets" had its worldwide premiere on 1 September 2005 in Poland, ahead of any French-speaking country. The song gathered great reviews and became a very successful single. Alas, it was the first and only single from On ne change pas in Poland.

The music download was released in Canada on the same day as the album (4 October 2005), but the CD single was released as late as March 2006 in France, Belgium and Switzerland. Then, "Tous les secrets" became a theme song from the animated movie Asterix and the Vikings meaning that it was not recorded as a theme song from the beginning.

The track was written and produced by Kristian Lundin, who already worked with Dion on hits like "That's the Way It Is" and "I'm Alive", and by Jacques Veneruso, who also wrote the songs "Sous le vent", "Tout l'or des hommes", and "Je ne vous oublie pas", among others.

The CD single included also an English-language version of "Tous les secrets," called "Let Your Heart Decide." Both versions could be found later on the Asterix and the Vikings movie soundtrack, released on 3 April 2006. The music videos for both versions include fragments from the film. They were released on 27 February 2006, and included later on the Asterix and the Vikings DVD, released on 25 October 2006.

Dion promoted this song by performing it in a French TV show, called Hit Machine.

"Tous les secrets" peaked at number 7 in Quebec, number 10 in Greece, number 20 in France and number 33 in Belgium Wallonia.

Dion performed "Tous Les Secrets" for the first time in concert for an acoustic medley during her Summer Tour 2016.

Track listing and formats
 European CD single
 "Tous les secrets" – 2:44
 "Let Your Heart Decide" – 2:45

Charts

Release history

References

Celine Dion songs
2006 singles
French-language songs
Songs written by Kristian Lundin
Songs written by Jacques Veneruso
2005 songs
Columbia Records singles
Epic Records singles
Songs written by Sebastian Thott
Songs written by Didrik Thott